The 1978–79 National Hurling League was the 48th season of the National Hurling League.

Division 1

Clare came into the season as defending champions of the 1977-78 season. Carlow entered Division 1 as the promoted team.

On 6 May 1979, Tipperary won the title after a 3-15 to 0-8 win over Galway in the final. It was their 14th league title overall and their first since 1967-68.

Carlow were relegated from Division 1 after just one season in the top flight.

Division 1A table

Group stage

Division 1B table

Group stage

Play-off

Knock-out stage
Quarter-finals

Semi-finals

Final

Scoring statistics
Top scorers overall

Division 2

Kerry won the title after a 3-7 to 3-4 win over Meath in the final round of the group stage.

Division 2 table

References

National Hurling League seasons
League
League